Joe Besser (August 12, 1907 – March 1, 1988) was an American actor, comedian and musician, known for his impish humor and wimpy characters. He is best known for his brief stint as a member of The Three Stooges in movie short subjects of 1957–59. He is also remembered for his television roles: Stinky, the bratty man-child in The Abbott and Costello Show, and Jillson, the maintenance man in The Joey Bishop Show.

Early life
Besser was born in St. Louis, Missouri, on August 12, 1907. He was the ninth child of Morris and Fanny [Fecht] Besser, Jewish immigrants from Eastern Europe. He had seven older sisters and an older brother, Manny, who was in show business, primarily as an ethnic Jewish comic. From an early age, Joe was fascinated with show business, especially the magic act of Howard Thurston that visited St. Louis annually. When Joe was 12, Thurston allowed him to be an audience plant. Besser was so excited by this that he sneaked into Thurston's train after the St. Louis run of the show was over and was discovered the next day sleeping on top of the lion's cage in Detroit.

Thurston informed Besser's parents of the situation and trained him as an assistant. The first act involved pulling a rabbit out of a hat. The trick involved two rabbits, one hidden in a pocket of Thurston's cape. But young Besser was so nervous that he botched badly, pulling out the rabbit from the cape at the same time as the other rabbit was on display, before the trick had been performed. The audience roared with laughter, and Besser from then on was assigned "comic mishap" roles only. Besser was placed by St. Louis juvenile authorities in a "corrective school" (reform school) at age 12.

Acting career 
Besser remained in show business and developed a comic character: an impish but whiny and bratty man who was easily excitable and upset, throwing temper tantrums with little provocation. Besser, with his frequent outbursts of "You crazy, youuuuu!" and "Not so faaaaaast!" or "Not so harrrrd!!" became a vaudeville headliner, and movie and radio appearances soon followed.

The comedy team of Olsen and Johnson, whose Broadway revues were fast-paced collections of songs and blackouts, hired Joe Besser to join their company. Besser's noisy intrusions fit the Olsen & Johnson style perfectly, and Besser's work caught the attention of the Shubert brothers, who signed Besser to a theatrical contract. Columbia Pictures hired Besser away from the Shuberts, and Besser relocated to Hollywood in 1944, where he brought his comic character to feature-length musical comedies like Hey, Rookie and Eadie Was a Lady (1945). On May 9, 1946, Besser appeared on the pioneering NBC television program Hour Glass, performing his "Army Drill" routine with stage partner Jimmy Little. According to an article in the May 27, 1946, issue of Life magazine, the show was seen by about 20,000 people on about 3,500 television sets, mostly in the New York City area. During this period, he appeared on the Jack Benny radio program in the episode entitled "Jack Prepares For Carnegie Hall" in June, 1943. Besser also starred in short-subject comedies for Columbia from 1949 to 1956. By this point, his persona was sufficiently well known that he was frequently caricatured in Looney Tunes animated shorts of the era. He appeared in the action film The Desert Hawk (1950).

Besser had substituted for Lou Costello on radio, opposite Bud Abbott, and by the 1950s he was firmly established as one of the Abbott and Costello regulars. When the duo filmed The Abbott and Costello Show for television, they hired Joe Besser to play Oswald "Stinky" Davis, a bratty, loudmouthed child dressed in an oversized Little Lord Fauntleroy outfit, shorts, and a flat-top hat with an overhanging brim. He appeared during the first season of The Abbott and Costello Show. Besser was cast for the role of Yonkel, a chariot man, in the low-budget biblical film Sins of Jezebel (1953), which starred Paulette Goddard as the titular wicked queen.

The Three Stooges
After Shemp Howard died of a heart attack while on his way home from a boxing night on November 22, 1955, at the age of 60, his surviving partners, Moe Howard and Larry Fine, had been working as a two-man team since Shemp's death (with Shemp seen entirely in older film footage). Moe suggested that he and Larry could continue working as "The Two Stooges." Studio chief Harry Cohn rejected the proposal. Although Moe had legal approval to allow new members into the act, Columbia executives had the final say about any actor who would appear in the studio's films and insisted on a performer already under contract to Columbia. At the time, Joe Besser was one of a few comedians still making comedy shorts at the studio. He successfully renegotiated his contract and was paid his former feature-film salary, which was more than the other Stooges earned.

Besser refrained from imitating Curly or Shemp. He continued to play the same whiny character he had developed over his long career. He had a clause in his contract that prohibited being hit excessively. Besser recalled, "I usually played the kind of character who would hit others back." He claimed that Larry volunteered to take the brunt of Moe's screen abuse. In a 2002 E! channel program that used file footage of Besser, the comic stated that the left side of Larry Fine's face was noticeably coarser than the other side, which he attributed to Moe's slaps.

As a result of his whiny persona and lack of true slapstick punishment against him (the cornerstone of Stooge humor), Joe has been less popular with contemporary Stooge aficionados, so much so that "Stooge-a-Polooza" TV host Rich Koz has even apologized on the air before showing Besser shorts; during the show's tenure, he received more than a few letters from viewers expressing their outrage over his airing them. Besser does have his defenders, however. Columbia historians Edward Watz and Ted Okuda have written appreciatively of Besser for bringing new energy to what was by then a flagging theatrical series.

The Stooges shorts with Besser were filmed from the spring of 1956 to the end of 1957. His Stooge tenure ended when Columbia shut down the two-reel comedy department on December 20, 1957. Producer-director Jules White had shot enough film for 16 comedies, which were released a few months apart until June 1959, with Sappy Bull Fighters being the final release.

After Besser joined in, for the first time in their career, the Stooges did not make any personal appearances during their layoff season, which began in 1956. There was a long-time belief, based on an existing ad, that the Stooges once performed live, with Besser as the third stooge, at the Paramount Theatre, Los Angeles, sometimes around 1957. It was later found that the ad was erroneously used for the act's personal appearances in December 1959, with Joe DeRita, rather than Besser, as part of the line-up. In fact, Besser never made any personal appearances as a member of the Three Stooges.

After their contract with Columbia ended, Moe Howard and Larry Fine discussed plans for a personal appearance tour, but Besser declined. His wife had suffered a heart attack in November 1957, and he was unwilling to leave without her. In later life, Besser praised Moe and Larry in a 1985 radio interview, from which a quote was aired on A&E Network's Biography. Besser said:

After the Stooges
Besser returned to films and television, most notably as the superintendent Jillson for four seasons (1961–1965) of The Joey Bishop Show. He also made occasional appearances on the ABC late-night series, also called The Joey Bishop Show, between 1967 and 1969. Besser also had roles on The Mothers-in-Law, Batman, The Good Guys, That Girl, and Love, American Style. He provided the voice of the dragon on The Alvin Show (1961), and he played Chubby Stone in the episode "Cry Love, Cry Murder" (S3 E25) of the private-eye series Peter Gunn (1961).

Besser also provided voices for several Saturday Morning cartoon series in the 1970s. He voiced the character Putty Puss in The Houndcats (1972), bumbling genie Babu in Jeannie (1973), (inspired by I Dream of Jeannie) and Scooby's All-Star Laff-A-Lympics, and as Scare Bear in Yogi's Space Race (1978). Besser's career slowed somewhat after he suffered a minor stroke in 1979, resulting in considerable weight loss.

Later in life, Besser expressed some dismay that people only recognized him for his brief tenure with the Stooges. However, he eventually softened, realizing that the Stooges continued to bring him his greatest exposure.

In 1984, Besser co-wrote with authors Jeff and Greg Lenburg his autobiography, Not Just a Stooge, for Excelsior Books. The book would be later retitled and republished as Once a Stooge, Always a Stooge following his death in 1988.

Joe Besser recalled his friendship with the Stooges in an emotional speech, referring to "the four boys [Moe, Larry, Curly, and Shemp] ... up in heaven" looking down at the dedication of a star to The Three Stooges on the Hollywood Walk of Fame on August 30, 1983. Stooges co-actor Emil Sitka, the only other Stooge attendee, also spoke; the only other surviving Stooge, Joe DeRita, was ill at the time, though he outlived Besser by five years.

In the spring of 2000, ABC aired a made-for-television movie The Three Stooges, with actor Laurence Coy appearing briefly as Besser. This depiction of Besser has been criticized as being unfairly negative.

Personal life
In 1932, Besser married dancer Erna Kay (born Ernestine Dora Kretschmer), known as "Ernie". The couple had no children.  They were neighbors and friends of Lou Costello, of the Abbott and Costello duo. Besser appeared in the Abbott and Costello movie Africa Screams (1949), which also featured Shemp Howard of the Three Stooges. Joe and Shemp were old friends, having met in 1932.

His cousin's grandson is Upright Citizens Brigade theater co-founder and improviser/comedian Matt Besser.

Death
Joe Besser died of heart failure on March 1, 1988, at the age of 80. His wife Erna died on July 1, 1989, from a heart attack at age 89. Both spouses are buried in the same plot in the Forest Lawn Memorial Park Cemetery in Glendale, California. Joe's marker reads, "Joe Besser / August 12, 1907 – March 1, 1988 / He Brought the World Love and Laughter", while Erna's reads, "Ernestine Besser / March 14, 1900 – July 1, 1989 / In Loving Memory." Besser's Stooge partner Larry Fine is in a crypt at the Freedom Mausoleum, which is a short distance away from the tomb.

Selected filmography

Theatrical

Features
 Hot Steel (1940) – Siggie
 Hey, Rookie (1944) – Pendelton
 Eadie Was a Lady (1945) – Professor Dingle
 Talk About a Lady (1946) – Roly Q. Entwhistle
 Feudin', Fussin' and A-Fightin (1948) – Sharkey Dolan
 Africa Screams (1949) – Harry
 Joe Palooka Meets Humphrey (1950) – Carlton
 Outside the Wall (1950) – cook (uncredited)
 Woman in Hiding (1950) – salesman
 The Desert Hawk (1950) – Prince Sinbad
 I, the Jury (1953) – Elevator Operator
 Sins of Jezebel (1953) – Yonkel
 Abbott and Costello Meet the Keystone Kops (1955) – Hunter (uncredited)
 Headline Hunters (1955) – Coroner
 Two-Gun Lady (1955) – Doc McGinnis
 Three Stooges Fun-O-Rama (1959)
 Say One for Me (1959) – Joe Greb
 Let's Make Love (1960) – Charlie Lamont
 The Silent Call (1961) – Art
 The Errand Boy (1961) – Man watching rushes
 Hand of Death (1962) – Service station attendant
 The Monk (1969) – Herbie (TV movie)
 Savage Intruder (1970) – Bus Driver
 Which Way to the Front? (1970) – Dock Master

Short subjects
 Cuckoorancho (1938) – Wanderer
 A Day in the Country (1953)
 The Three Stooges (1957–1959)
 The Woodcutter's House (1959)

Joe Besser with Hawthorne short subject series
 Waiting in the Lurch (1949) – Eric Loudermilk Potts
 Dizzy Yardbird (1950) – Rodney Marblehead
 'Fraidy Cat (1951) – Det. Joe Besser
 Aim, Fire, Scoot (1952) – Pvt. Joe Besser
 Caught on the Bounce (1952) – Daddy
 Spies and Guys (1953) – Pvt. Joe Besser
 The Fire Chaser  (1954) – Eric Loudermilk Potts
 G.I. Dood It (1955) – Pvt. Joe Marblehead
 Hook a Crook (1955) – Det. Joe Besser
 Army Daze (1956) – Pvt. Joe Besser

Television
 The Ken Murray Show (1950)
 The Colgate Comedy Hour (1951–1953)
 The Alan Young Show (1951)
 The Abbott and Costello Show (1952–1953) – Stinky Davis
 The Spike Jones Show (1954) – jailhouse warden
 My Little Margie (1954) – butterfly catcher
 The Jack Benny Program (1954–1961)
 The Millionaire (1955) – hobo
 Willy (1955), episode "Willy Saves Harvey From Fraud"
 Damon Runyon Theater (1955)
 The Martha Raye Show (1955)
 Club Oasis (1958)
 Kraft Music Hall (1959)
 General Electric Theater (1961) – Fight manager
 The Alvin Show (1961–1962) – Additional voices
 The Joey Bishop Show (1962–1965) – Mr. Jillson
 Batman (1966) – Hizzoner the Penguin
 The Mothers-in-Law (1968) – "How Not to Manage a Rock Group", "The First Anniversary is the Hardest"
 That's Life (1968)
 That Girl (1968) – "Eleven Angry Men and That Girl"
 The Don Rickles Show (1968)
 Where's Huddles? (1970) – Coach (voice)
 The Houndcats (1972) – Putty Puss (voice)
 Jeannie (1973) – Babu (voice)
 The New Scooby-Doo Movies (1973) – Babu (voice)
 The Oddball Couple (1975) – Additional voices
 Scooby's All Star Laff-A-Lympics (1977–1978) – Babu (voice)
 Fred Flintstone and Friends (1977–1978) – Babu (voice)
 Yogi's Space Race (1978) – Scare Bear (voice)
 Galaxy Goof-Ups (1978–1979) – Scare Bear (voice)
 Shirt Tales (1982) – Elmo the Elephant (voice)
 My Smurfy Valentine (1983) – Cupid (voice)

References

Further reading
 Not Just a Stooge (later retitled Once a Stooge, Always a Stooge) by Joe Besser with Jeff Lenburg and Greg Lenburg , (Excelsior Books, 1984).
 The Three Stooges Scrapbook by Jeff Lenburg, Joan Howard Maurer, and Greg Lenburg (Citadel Press, 2000).

External links

 
 
 
 
 170 high-definition clips, many rare of Joe Besser

1907 births
1988 deaths
American male film actors
American male television actors
American male voice actors
Jewish American male actors
Jewish American comedians
American male comedians
20th-century American comedians
Jewish male comedians
Male actors from St. Louis
The Three Stooges members
Vaudeville performers
Burials at Forest Lawn Memorial Park (Glendale)
20th-century American male actors
American male comedy actors
Columbia Pictures contract players